Dogs of War is a vertically scrolling run and gun video game developed and published by Elite Systems for the Amiga and Atari ST in 1989. Players assume the role of free-lance mercenaries who are sent on international assignments to topple governments and rescue people in danger.

Gameplay
Dogs of War offers a campaign consisting of twelve missions that can be completed in single-player or co-op mode. In each mission, players must complete different objectives, such as rescuing a kidnapped child, retrieving a valuable piece of art, or killing a criminal, all the while defending against waves of enemies. Missions become increasingly more difficult as the player progresses through the game. Upon completing missions, players earn money which can be used to purchase new items and upgrade their weapons, necessary to take down heavy obstacles that appear in later stages such as turrets, military jeeps, and tanks. Weapons in the game include pistols, Kalashnikovs, chain guns, grenades, rocket launchers, and a flamethrower. After completing all twelve missions, the players' characters are offered the choice to join either the regular or salvation army.

Reception 
Dogs of War received moderate and mixed reviews. Zzap!64 magazine editors Robin and Phil gave the game an overall score of 77%, stating that the game was "hardly innovative... [but] very addictive and (as always) more fun with two players... this is great mindless fun." User-run forums such as Lemon Amiga and Atari Mania gave the game a 7.04 and 7.4/10, respectively.

External forums 

 Emualysis Review

References

Amiga games
Atari ST games
1989 video games
Run and gun games
Video games scored by David Whittaker
Video games developed in the United Kingdom
Vectordean games